Gordon Research Conferences are a group of international scientific conferences organized by a non-profit organization of the same name.  The conference topics cover frontier research in the biological, chemical, and physical sciences, and their related technologies.  The conferences have been held since 1931, and have expanded to almost 200 conferences per year.  Conference locations are chosen partly for their scenic and often isolated nature, to encourage an informal community atmosphere.  Contributions are "off-record", with references to the conference in any publication strictly prohibited to encourage free discussion, often of unpublished research.  Conferences were extended to cover science education in 1991.  The conference topics are regularly publicised in the journal Science: 2017, 2015,  2010, 2009, 2008,
2007, and 2006.

History

The forerunner of the Gordon Conferences was the summer sessions held at the chemistry department of Johns Hopkins University in the late 1920s. By 1931 this had evolved into a graduate seminar that was also attended by external participants.  The Gordon Research Conferences were initiated by Prof. Neil Gordon while at the Johns Hopkins University.

References

External links
 Gordon Research Conferences website

Academic conferences